L'église Saint-Jean-Baptiste is a church in Virargues in the Cantal département in the Auvergne-Rhône-Alpes region of France. It was built in the 12th century, and modified in the 15th, 16th and 17th centuries.

See also
Sainte-Reine Church

References

External links
  X2=100&MAX3=100&DOM=Tous Église Saint-Jean-Baptiste in the Mérimée database] 
 A picture of Église Saint-Jean-Baptiste (lower part  right-hand)

Note
Summed up and translated from the equivalent article at French Wikipédia, 29 May 2008

Roman Catholic churches in France
Churches in Cantal